Catopsilia florella, the African migrant, African emigrant, or common vagrant, is a butterfly of the family Pieridae. It is found in Africa (including Madagascar),  Arabia (United Arab Emirates, Saudi Arabia, Oman) and the Canary Islands. Like Catopsilia pomona, this species also has a habit of migration.

Many early authors mentioned the presence of this species in Asia; but those were probably due to confusion arises as Catopsilia pyranthe females exhibit a lot of seasonal variations. Catopsilia florella is not included as a species in India in any recent checklists.

The wingspan is 54–60 mm for males and 56–66 mm for females. Adults are on wing year-round. From South Africa, adults migrate from summer to autumn. They fly in a north-eastern direction.

The larvae feed on Senna occidentalis, Senna septentrionalis, Senna petersiana, Senna italica, Cassia javanica, and Cassia fistula.

Gallery

References

Coliadinae
Butterflies of Africa
Lepidoptera of Cape Verde
Butterflies described in 1775
Taxa named by Johan Christian Fabricius